American Airlines Flight 711 was a scheduled flight departing from Newark, New Jersey to Tulsa, Oklahoma, with several intermediate stops, Springfield, Missouri being one of them. On March 20, 1955, the aircraft operating the service, a Convair CV-240-0, registration  crashed into a muddy field on approach to land at Springfield-Branson Regional Airport near Springfield, Missouri, killing 13 of the 35 aboard (11 passengers, 2 crew members), and injuring the other 22 on board. Of the three crew members, the pilot survived, and the co-pilot and stewardess did not.

The pilot of the flight, Jack Pripesh, suffered considerable injuries including the loss of his right eye, and was in a coma for some time after the crash. Almost two weeks after the crash, Pripesh told reporters he could remember nothing of it.

Findings of fact regarding the crash were published by the Civil Aeronautics Board on September 22, 1955. The board determined that a complete instrument landing approach into Springfield-Branson was not made, as would have been required based on the deteriorating weather conditions at the time. Evidence showed that the crew didn't seem to be aware of the aircraft's altitude and that the aircraft was descending. The board believed it was probable that "the pilots were devoting their attention away from their instruments and outside the cockpit, possibly toward the distant airport lights."

See also 

 1955 in aviation
 1955 in the United States
 Aviation accidents and incidents
 List of accidents and incidents involving commercial aircraft

Notes and references 
 Notes

 References

External links 
 Report - Civil Aeronautics Board - PDF
 Aviation Safety Network: American Airlines Flight 711

Airliner accidents and incidents in Missouri
Greene County, Missouri
711
Disasters in Missouri
Accidents and incidents involving the Convair CV-240 family
1955 in Missouri
March 1955 events in the United States
Aviation accidents and incidents in the United States in 1955